Ben Arous Governorate is one of the twenty-four governorates of Tunisia. It is in the north-east of Tunisia and adjoins smaller Tunis Governorate. It covers an area of 761 km² and had a population of 712,172 as at the 2019 census. The capital is Ben Arous.

Geography 
The governorate is centred  from the capital and surrounded by the governorates of Tunis, Zaghouan, Manouba, and Nabeul.  It has a short coastline, along the Gulf of Tunis to the northeast including the country's main commercial port, Radès.

The average temperature is between 6.8 °C and 17.9 °C, and annual rainfall is 275–515 millimeters.

Economy

Agriculture

Administrative divisions

Administratively, the governorate is divided into twelve delegations (mutamadiyat), eleven municipalities, six rural councils, and 75 sectors (imadas). The delegations and their populations from the 2004 and 2014 censuses, are listed below:

Eleven municipalities are in Ben Arous Governorate:

References

 
Governorates of Tunisia